Levi Yehoshua Shapiro (Yiddish: ל. שאַפּיראָ, born 1878, died 1948), better known as "Lamed Shapiro", (lamed is the Yiddish name of the letter ל), was an American Yiddish author. His stories are best known for such themes as murder, rape, and cannibalism.

Biography
He was born on March 10, 1878, in Rzhyshchiv, Ukraine.  In 1896, he traveled to Warsaw, struggled to work for two years, then returned to Ukraine. He experienced a pogrom, fell in love and attempted suicide, and was later conscripted into the Imperial Russian Army. These experiences would influence much of his rather dark, fictional themes. Shapiro returned to Warsaw in 1903, and I. L. Peretz helped him publish his first literary works: Di Fligl ("The Wings"); and, the next year, a longer story called Itsikl Mamzer ("Little Isaac the Bastard"), published in a journal edited by Avrom Reyzen. To Peretz he would dedicate one of his works, Smoke, a tale of the Old World (Peretz would serve as an early benefactor of another famous Yiddish writer, Der Nister).

Shapiro left for America in 1905.  He stayed for a year in London, where he befriended the Hebrew writer Yosef Haim Brenner.  After arriving in New York in 1906, and working for The Forward, he began publishing his gruesome pogrom tales: "The Kiss" (1907); "Pour Out Thy Wrath" (1908); "The Cross" (1909); "In The Dead Town" (1910).  Shapiro's work marks a break from that of the three classic Yiddish writers in its foregrounding of violence and psychological realism, rather than satirical commentary. Shapiro subsequently returned to Warsaw for a year, then returned permanently to the United States in 1911.  By 1919, Shapiro had written what are considered his two greatest pogrom stories: "White Challah" and "The Jewish Government." The two stories "remain some of the most aesthetically nuanced and psychologically complex treatments of the pogrom theme in modern Jewish literature."

Shapiro and his family moved to Los Angeles in 1921. His wife, Freydl, died there in 1927, and he then returned to New York.  Back in New York yet again, Shapiro worked at several literary periodicals, was active in the Communist party, and was employed by the Federal Writers' Project in 1937.  Shapiro returned to LA in 1939, where he lived at 544 Heliotrope Drive in East Hollywood.

Death
Shapiro died in Los Angeles in 1948 while living in a friend's garage.  He died an alcoholic and poor.  He was buried at the Mount Zion Cemetery in East Los Angeles next to his wife and his tombstone was inscribed with the words: "Lamed Levi Shapiro, Author of the Yiddishe Melukhe".

Works
Afn yam (At the Sea), 1910
Novelen (Novellas), 1910
Di yidishe melukhe un andere zakhn (The Jewish Government and Other Things), 1919
Nyu-yorkish un andere zakhn (New York and Other Things), 1931
Fun korbn minkhe (From the Afternoon Offering), 1941
Der shrayber geyt in kheyder (The Writer Goes to School), 1945
Der Amerikaner Shed (The American Demon), an unfinished novel
Ksuvim (Works), 1949

In English translation
 The Cross and Other Jewish Stories. New Haven: Yale University Press, 2007. Edited and with an introduction by Leah Garrett. 
The Jewish Government and Other Stories, edited and translated by Curt Leviant, 1971

Critical discourse
Curt Leviant, noted translator of Yiddish literature and a novelist in his own right, wrote his MA thesis on Shapiro: “Lamed Shapiro: Master Craftsman of the Yiddish Short Stories”, Columbia University, 1957.

David G. Roskies, professor of Yiddish literature at Jewish Theological Seminary of America, has done critical work on Lamed Shapiro, and places him in the context of World War I-era Jewish writers like Isaac Babel.

Notes

References
 
  Review of Lamed Shapiro, The Cross and Other Jewish Stories.
 Hoffman, Matthew (2002). "Shapiro, (Levi Joshua) Lamed." In: Sorrel Kerbel, et al. (Eds.), Jewish Writers of the Twentieth Century. New York: Fitzroy Dearborn. pp. 984–987. .
 "Lamed Shapiro" [author biography] (2001). In: Jules Chametzky, et al. (Eds.). Jewish American Literature: A Norton Anthology. New York: Norton. pp. 154–155.

1878 births
1948 deaths
People from Rzhyshchiv
People from Kiev Governorate
Yiddish-language writers
Jewish American writers
American people of Ukrainian-Jewish descent
Ukrainian Jews
Emigrants from the Russian Empire to the United States